Andrei Romanov may refer to:
 Andrei Aleksandrovich Romanov (born 1980), Russian footballer
 Andrei Romanov (racing driver) (born 1979), Russian racecar driver
 Andrei Romanov (swimmer), Soviet swimmer who participated in the 1988 European Junior Swimming Championships
 Andrey Romanov (politician), Bulgarian politician, mayor of Pleven from 1971 to 1979
 Andrei Igorevich Romanov, known as Dyusha Romanov (born 1956), Russian musician, flautist, keyboardist and backing singer of the band Aquarium
 Andrey Andreyevich Romanov, artist and great-nephew of Nicholas II of Russia
 Andrei Romanov (skier), Russian Paralympian
 Andrei Romanov (wrestler), Moldovan national freestyle wrestling champion